Hypnotic is a 2021 American thriller film directed by Matt Angel and Suzanne Coote, written by Richard D'Ovidio and starring Kate Siegel, Jason O'Mara, and Dulé Hill. It was released on October 27, 2021, by Netflix.

Plot 
A young woman seeking self-improvement enlists the help of a renowned hypnotherapist. But after a handful of intense sessions, she discovers unexpected and deadly consequences.
The hypnotist engages her in a lethal game of mind manipulation.

Cast 
 Kate Siegel as Jenn Tompson
 Jason O'Mara as Dr. Collin Meade
 Dulé Hill as Detective Wade Rollins
 Lucie Guest as Gina Kelman
 Jaime M. Callica as Brian Rawley
 Tanja Dixon-Warren as Dr. Stella Graham
 Luc Roderique as Scott Kelman
 Devyn Dalton as Tabby
 Stephanie Cudmore as Andrea Bowen
 Jessie Fraser as Amy
 Darien Martin as Squad Leader
 Madeleine Kelders as Female Executive

Reception 
On review aggregator Rotten Tomatoes, the film holds an approval rating of 27% based on 15 critical reviews, with an average rating of 4.6/10. On Metacritic, Hypnotic holds a score of 33 out of 100 based on 5 critics, indicating "generally unfavorable reviews".

References

External links 
 
 

2021 films
2021 thriller films
2020s English-language films
American thriller films
English-language Netflix original films
Films about hypnosis
2020s American films